Quyang County is under the administration of Baoding City, Hebei province, China. The county is famous for its stone carvings, many of which are exported abroad. The Beiyue Temple is located in Quyang city.

Administrative divisions
Towns:
Hengzhou, Lingshan, Yanzhao, Yangping

Townships:
Luzhuangzi Township, Xiahe Township, Zhuangke Township, Xiaomu Township, Wende Township, Dongwang Township, Xiaolin Township, Dicun Township, Chande Township, Qicun Township, Dangcheng Township, Langjiazhuang Township, Fanjiazhuang Township, Beitai Township

Climate

Notes

Geography of Baoding
County-level divisions of Hebei